New Zealand has a quite large TV industry, producing programs for the local market, and some for the international market. TV production in New Zealand is centred on Auckland,Wellington and Christchurch but other companies exist in towns and cities across the country.

Production companies
Below is a list of New Zealand television production companies.

A 
 Asia Vision
 Avalon Studios

B 
 Beyond Productions

C 
 Channel North Television

D 
 Daybreak Pacific

F 
 Face TV

G 
 Great Southern Television
 Greenstone Pictures

H 
Te Hokioi Film and Publishing Company (founded by Tama Poata; defunct)

N 
 Natural History New Zealand

O 
 Orly Creative Media

P 
 Pacific Films (historic) 
 Phoenix Television
 Phoenix TV

S 
 South Pacific Pictures

T 
 Television New Zealand
 Touchdown Television
 TV3
 TVNZ
 TVNZ Natural History

W 
 Whitebait Productions
 Wingnut Films

See also 
 List of television production companies

References